Jason Bulgarelli (born 20 May 1976) is an Australian former professional rugby league footballer who played in the 2000s. He previously played for the Canberra Raiders, winning the club's Rookie of the Year award in 2003. He primarily played in the centres.

Playing career
Bulgarelli was born in Brandon, Queensland and played his junior rugby league for the Burdekin Roosters.

An Illawarra Steelers lower grader, Bulgarelli was playing with Easts Tigers in the Queensland Cup, before joining the Canberra Raiders. Bulgarelli made his NRL debut in round 10 of the 2003 season at the age of 27, and was the club's rookie of the year.

In August, 2004, he was named alongside club greats Laurie Daley and Sam Backo when the Raiders selected a side representing
the all-time best Aboriginal and Torres Strait Islanders to have played for the club.

Bulgarelli was sacked from the Raiders' club in 2004 after a package he allegedly tried to collect was discovered to contain ecstasy tablets. He later returned to the Queensland Cup with the Ipswich Jets.

He had represented the Italian rugby league team

References

External links 
 Jason Bulgarelli's NRL Stats

1976 births
Living people
Australian people of Italian descent
Australian rugby league players
Canberra Raiders players
Eastern Suburbs Tigers players
Indigenous Australian rugby league players
Ipswich Jets players
Italy national rugby league team players
Rugby league centres
Rugby league players from Queensland